Edgar Bauer (7 October 1820 – 18 August 1886) was a German political philosopher and a member of the Young Hegelians. He was the younger brother of Bruno Bauer. According to Lawrence S. Stepelevich, Edgar Bauer was the most anarchistic of the Young Hegelians, and "...it is possible to discern, in the early writings of Edgar Bauer, the theoretical justification of political terrorism." German anarchists such as Max Nettlau and Gustav Landauer credited Edgar Bauer with founding the anarchist tradition in Germany. In the mid-1840s, Marx' and Engels' critique of the Bauer brothers marked the beginning of their collaboration and an important stage in the development of Marxist thought. Edgar Bauer participated in the Revolution of 1848. Subsequently he became a conservative.

Young Hegelianism and radical politics

Edgar Bauer was born in Charlottenburg. He studied jurisprudence and philosophy at the University of Berlin, where he became a member of the Young Hegelian circle around his brother Bruno Bauer. Other members of his circle were Arnold Ruge, Karl Marx, Max Stirner, Friedrich Engels, Georg Herwegh, Karl Grün, Moses Hess and Mikhail Bakunin. He was especially close to Engels at that time. Edgar Bauer soon became a regular contributor to a variety of philosophical and political publications, distinguishing himself by a particularly enthusiastic revolutionary ideology. He did not follow the 'materialist turn' in Young Hegelian philosophy inaugurated by Ludwig Feuerbach (as Marx, Engels, Grün and others did), but instead remained true to the Neo-Fichtean idealist 'philosophy of action' propagated by his brother Bruno. Like Bruno, Edgar was a staunch anti-theist and considered the emancipation from religion a necessary precondition of social emancipation. Unlike Bruno, who was sceptical of socialism, Edgar considered himself a socialist and was usually associated with the 'True Socialists' around Hess and Grün. When Bruno Bauer was dismissed from his academic position because of his atheism, it became clear to Edgar that, given his brother's reputation and his own growing track record as a radical publicist, an academic career was closed to him. In 1842 he abandoned his studies and became a free-lance writer and journalist. He contributed to the liberal Rheinische Zeitung, among other publications.

Imprisonment, revolution and exile

In 1843 he published a book titled The Conflict of Criticism with Church and State. This caused him to be charged with sedition. He was imprisoned for four years in the fortress at Magdeburg. While he was in prison, his former associates Marx and Engels published a scathing critique of him and his brother Bruno, titled The Holy Family (1844). They resumed the attack in The German Ideology (1846), which was not published at the time. In spite of this, Edgar Bauer seems to have remained on friendly terms with Marx and Engels. Released on the eve of the Revolution of 1848, Edgar Bauer participated in the revolutionary fighting in Berlin and Hamburg. After the defeat of the revolutionaries he went into hiding and then lived under an assumed name in Altona for several years, working as a journalist. During the German-Danish war over Schleswig-Holstein (1848–51), he supported the Danish side.

In 1851, facing imminent arrest, he escaped to Denmark and thence to London, England, where he lived in exile for several years. During this time he often met Karl Marx, who was living in London, but the relationship was not one of mutual respect. During one argument with Marx, Bauer even "lost his temper and punched Marx in the face".

Amnesty and conservatism

In 1861, an amnesty enabled Bauer to return to Germany. By now thoroughly conservative, he had renounced anarchism, socialism, democracy, atheism and critical philosophy. He settled in Hanover, became a Prussian civil servant and in 1870 founded the conservative periodical Kirchliche Blätter. He died in Hanover on August 18, 1886. His literary remains are in the Archiv der sozialen Demokratie (Archive of Social Democracy) in Bonn.

Quote
"'No private property, no privilege, no difference in status, no usurpatory regime'. So reads our pronunciamento; it is negative, but history will write its affirmation." — Bauer, E., 'The Political Revolution' (1842). As quoted in: Stepelevich, L. S. (ed.), The Young Hegelians. An anthology. Cambridge University Press, 1983, pp. 263–274.

Works
Geschichte Europas seit der ersten französischen Revolution (von Archibald Alison). In: Deutsche Jahrbücher für Wissenschaft und Kunst, 14./15./16. Dezember 1842
Der Streit der Kritik mit Kirche und Staat (Charlottenburg, 1843)
Denkwürdigkeiten zur Geschichte der neuern Zeit (1843–1844, 12 Hefte, with Bruno Bauer)
Die Geschichte der konstitutionellen Bewegungen im südlichen Deutschland während der Jahre 1831–34 (Charlottenburg, 1845, 3 Bd.)
Die Kunst der Geschichtsschreibung und Herrn Dahlmanns Geschichte der französischen Revolution (Magdeburg, 1846)
Geschichte des Luthertums (under the pen name Martin von Geismar, Leipzig, 1846–1847)
Über die Ehe im Sinn des Luthertums (Leipzig, 1847)
Der Mensch und die Ehe vor dem Richterstuhle der Sittlichkeit. In: Die Epigonen. Fünfter Band (1848), pp. 317–343
Das Teutsche Reich in seiner geschichtlichen Gestalt (Altona, 1872)
Die Wahrheit über die Internationale (Altona, 1873)
Englische Freiheit (Leipzig, 1857)
Die Rechte des Herzogtums Holstein (Berlin, 1863)
Die Deutschen und ihre Nachbarn (Hamburg, 1870)
Artikel V, der deutsche Gedanke und die dänische Monarchie (Altona, 1873)
Der Freimaurerbund und das Licht (Hannover, 1877)
Der Magus des Nordens. Novelle. 1882

Notes

External links
 
 https://web.archive.org/web/20160304050848/https://portal.d-nb.de/opac.htm?query=Woe%3D118507265&method=simpleSearch
 http://www.marxists.org/subject/anarchism/bauer/political-revolution.htm
 http://www.faqs.org/espionage/Te-Uk/Terrorism-Philosophical-and-Ideological-Origins.html

1820 births
1866 deaths
19th-century German philosophers
German anarchists
German socialists
German atheists
German male writers
19th-century atheists